The 2011 Ontario general election took place on Thursday, October 6, 2011 to elect members of the Legislative Assembly of Ontario, Canada.

Candidates by region

Ottawa

|-
|bgcolor=whitesmoke|13. Carleton—Mississippi Mills
|
|Megan Cornell 19,144 (34.08%)
||
|Jack MacLaren 28,246 (50.29%)
|
|Liam Duff 6,371 (11.34%)
|
|Scott Simser 1,857 (3.31%)
|
|Cynthia Bredfeldt (FCP) 549 (0.98%)
||
|Norm Sterling† 
|-
|bgcolor=whitesmoke|52. Nepean—Carleton
|
|Don Dransfield  14,844 (26.97%)
||
|Lisa MacLeod 29,984 (54.48%)
|
|Ric Dagenais 8,127 (14.77%)
|
|Gordon Kubanek 1,641 (2.98%)
|
|Roger Toutant (Libertarian) 223 (0.41%)  Marco Rossi (FPO) 217 (0.39%)
||
|Lisa MacLeod
|-
|bgcolor=whitesmoke|62. Ottawa Centre
||
|Yasir Naqvi 23,646 (46.81%)
|
|Rob Dekker 9,257 (18.33%)
|
|Anil Naidoo 14,715 (29.13%)
|
|Kevin O'Donnell  2,184 (4.32%)
|
|Stuart Ryan (Communist) 160 (0.32%) Kristina Chapman (Ind) 309 (0.61%) Michal Zeithammel (Libertarian) 240 (0.48%)
||
|Yasir Naqvi
|-
|bgcolor=whitesmoke|63. Ottawa—Orléans
||
|Phil McNeely 21,857 (46.44%)
|
|Andrew Lister  19,003 (40.38%)
|
|Doug McKercher 4,979 (10.58%)
|
|Tanya Gutmanis 886 (1.88%)
|
|David Paul (Libertarian) 154 (0.33%)  David McGruer (FPO) 183 (0.39%)
||
|Phil McNeely
|-
|bgcolor=whitesmoke|64. Ottawa South
||
|Dalton McGuinty 21,842 (49.12%)
|
|Jason MacDonald 14,945 (33.61%)
|
|Wali Farah 5,988 (13.47%)
|
|James Mihaychuk 1,442 (3.24%)
|
|Jean-Serge Brisson (Libertarian) 252 (0.57%)  John Redins (PSN) 238 (0.54%)
||
|Dalton McGuinty
|-
|bgcolor=whitesmoke|65. Ottawa—Vanier
||
|Madeleine Meilleur 19,619 (51.29%)
|
|Fred Sherman 8,929 (23.35%)
|
|Paul Étienne Laliberté-Tipple 7,466 (19.52%)
|
|Dave Bagler 1,719 (4.49%)
|
|Emmanuel Houle (FCP)352 (0.92%)
||
|Madeleine Meilleur
|-
|bgcolor=whitesmoke|66. Ottawa West—Nepean
||
|Bob Chiarelli 18,492 (41.46)
|
|Randall Denley 17,483 (39.19%)
|
|Wendy Byrne 6,576 (14.74%)
|
|Alex Hill 1,485 (3.33%)
|
|John Pacheco (FCP) 396 (0.89%)
||
|Bob Chiarelli
|-
|}

Eastern Ontario

|-
|bgcolor=whitesmoke|26. Glengarry—Prescott—Russell
||
|Grant Crack17,345 (42.89%)
|
|Marilissa Gosselin15,973 (39.50%)
|
|Bonnie Jean-Louis5,721 (15.15%)
|
|Taylor Howarth770 (1.90%)
|
|Phil Miller (Libertarian)199 (0.49%)  Carl Leduc (FPO)164 (0.41%)
||
|Jean-Marc Lalonde†
|-
|bgcolor=whitesmoke|36. Kingston and the Islands
||
|John Gerretsen21,028 (48.66%)
|
|Rodger James9,610 (22.24%)
|
|Mary Rita Holland10,241 (23.70%)
|
|Robert Kiley1,594 (3.69%)
|
|Jamie Shaw (Libertarian) 115 (0.27%)  David Best (PFRP) 56 (0.13%) Paul Busch (FPO) 71 (0.16%) David Caracciolo (FCP) 336 (0.78%)
||
|John Gerretsen
|-
|bgcolor=whitesmoke|41. Lanark—Frontenac—Lennox and Addington
|
|Bill MacDonald12,490 (27.78%)
||
|Randy Hillier 22,457 (49.95%)
|
|Dave Parkhill 8,104 (18.02%)
|
|Nancy Matte 1,754 (3.90%)
|
| 
||
|Randy Hillier
|-
|bgcolor=whitesmoke|42. Leeds—Grenville
|
|Ray Heffernan6,663 (17.36%)
||
|Steve Clark 24,314 (63.34%)
|
|David Lundy 5,822 (15.17%)
|
|Charlie Taylor1,319 (3.45%)
|
|Lance Fulsom (Socialist)111 (0.29%)
||
|Steve Clark
|-
|bgcolor=whitesmoke|73. Prince Edward—Hastings
|
|Leona Dombrowsky15,686 (35.13%)
||
|Todd Smith18,816 (42.13%)
|
|Sherry Hayes 7,379 (16.52%)
|
|Treat Hull2,049 (4.59%)
|
|Neal Ford (FCP)257 (0.58%)  Trueman Tuck (PFRP)115 (0.26%) Andrew Skinner (Libertarian)201 (0.45%)
||
|Leona Dombrowsky
|-
|bgcolor=whitesmoke|74. Renfrew—Nipissing—Pembroke
|
|John O'Leary6,231 (15.94%)
||
|John Yakabuski27,594 (70.58%)
|
|Brian Dougherty4,277 (10.94%)
|
|Kyle Jones574 (1.47%)
|
|Murray Reid (COR)309 (0.79%)
||
|John Yakabuski
|-
|bgcolor=whitesmoke|87. Stormont—Dundas—South Glengarry
|
|Mark MacDonald8,413 (21.54%)
||
|Jim McDonell21,463 (54.96%)
|
|Elaine MacDonald8,021 (20.54%)
|
|Justin Reist551 (1.41%)
|
|Darcy Neal Donnelly (Libertarian)396 (1.01%)
||
|Jim Brownell†
|-
|}

Central Ontario

|-
|bgcolor=whitesmoke|4. Barrie
| 
|Karl Walsh 15,006 (34.66%)
||
|Rod Jackson 17,527 (40.49%)
|
|Myrna Clark 8,171 (18.87%)
|
|Andrew Miller 1,909 (4.41%)
|
|Matthew MacKenzie (FPO) 179 (0.41%)  Darren Roskam (Libertarian) 318 (0.73%)
||
|Aileen Carroll†
|-
|bgcolor=whitesmoke|10. Bruce—Grey—Owen Sound
|
|Kevin Eccles 10,889 (26.26%)
||
|Bill Walker 19,567 (47.18%)
|
|Paul Johnstone 6,133 (14.79%)
|
|Don Marshall 2,654 (6.40%)
|
|Jay Miller (Libertarian) 246 (0.59%)   Shane Jolley (Ind) 1,478 (3.56%) Joel Kidd (FCP) 339 (0.82%)
||
|Bill Murdoch†
|-
|bgcolor=whitesmoke|18. Dufferin—Caledon
|
|Lori Holloway 10,162 (26.64%)
||
|Sylvia Jones 17,833 (46.74%)
|
|Karen Gventer 4,200 (11.01%)
|
|Rob Strang 5,540 (14.52%)
|
|Daniel Kowalewski (Libertarian) 250 (0.66%)
||
|Sylvia Jones 
|-
|bgcolor=whitesmoke|19. Durham
|
|Betty Somerville 13,394 (29.24%)
||
|John O'Toole 22,393 (48.89%)
|
|James Terry 8,027 (17.52%)
|
|Edward Yaghledjian 1,221 (2.67%)
|
|David Strutt (FPO) 172 (0.38%)  Blaize Barnicoat (Libertarian) 424 (0.93%)
||
|John O'Toole
|-
|bgcolor=whitesmoke|29. Haliburton—Kawartha Lakes—Brock
|
|Rick Johnson 16,522 (33.45%)
||
|Laurie Scott 22,352 (45.26%)
|
|Don Abel 8,517 (17.25%)
|
|Anita Payne 1,562 (3.16%)
|
|Charles Olito (FPO) 245 (0.50%)
||
|Rick Johnson
|-
|bgcolor=whitesmoke|53. Newmarket—Aurora
|
|Christina Bisanz 16,154 (35.50%)
||
|Frank Klees 21,425 (47.09%)
|
|Robin Wardlaw 6,514 (14.32%)
|
|Kristopher Kuysten 1,256 (2.76%)
|
|
||
|Frank Klees
|-
|bgcolor=whitesmoke|58. Northumberland—Quinte West
|
|Lou Rinaldi 18,572 (38.20%)
||
|Rob Milligan 19,279 (39.65%)
|
|Kira Mees 8,589 (17.67%)
|
|Judy Smith Torrie 1,483 (3.05%)
|
|Jeffrey McLarty (Libertarian) 357 (0.73%) Richard Martin Rieger (Ind) 159 (0.33%)
||
|Lou Rinaldi
|-
|bgcolor=whitesmoke|71. Peterborough
||
|Jeff Leal 19,430 (39.75%)
|
|Alan Wilson 15,323 (31.35%)
|
|Dave Nickle 12,460 (25.49%)
|
|Gary Beamish 1,235 (2.53%)
|
|Ken Ranney (Socialist) 83 (0.17%) Alex Long (FPO) 127 (0.26%)
||
|Jeff Leal
|-
|bgcolor=whitesmoke|85. Simcoe—Grey
|
|Donna Kenwell 10,404 (22.23%)
||
|Jim Wilson 25,339 (54.14%)
|
|David Matthews 6,839 (14.61%)
|
|Mike Schreiner 4,057 (8.67%)
|
|
||
|Jim Wilson
|-
|bgcolor=whitesmoke|86. Simcoe North
|
|Fred Larsen 10,191 (22.34%)
||
|Garfield Dunlop 25,081 (54.99%)
|
|Doris Middleton 7,710 (16.90%)
|
|Peter Stubbins 2,488 (5.45%)
|
|
||
|Garfield Dunlop
|-
|bgcolor=whitesmoke|105. York—Simcoe
|
|Gloria Reszler 9,496 (24.42%)
||
|Julia Munro 20,425 (52.53%)
|
|Megan Tay 6,607 (16.99%)
|
|Meade Helman 1,479 (3.80%)
|
|Mark Harrison (FPO) 201 (0.52%) Craig Hodgins (Libertarian) 489 (1.26%)
||
|Julia Munro
|}

Southern Durham & York

|-
|bgcolor=whitesmoke|1. Ajax—Pickering
||
|Joe Dickson 19,606 (47.14%)
|
|Todd McCarthy 14,718 (35.39%)
|
|Evan Wiseman 5,952 (14.31%)
|
|Steven Toman 843 (2.03%)
|
|Andrew Delis (Libertarian) 299 (0.72%)
||
|Joe Dickson
|-
|bgcolor=whitesmoke|46. Markham—Unionville
||
|Michael Chan 19,579 (52.18%)
|
|Shan Thayaparan 11,720 (31.24%)
|
|P. C. Choo 4,575 (12.19%)
|
|Myles O'Brien 1,104 (2.94%)
|
|Allen Small (Libertarian) 259 (0.69%)
||
|Michael Chan
|-
|bgcolor=whitesmoke|59. Oak Ridges—Markham
||
|Helena Jaczek 28,878 (44.51%)
|
|Farid Wassef 23,950 (36.91%)
|
|Joe Whitfeld 8,548 (13.17%)
|
|Trifon Haitas 1,569 (2.42%)
|
|Karl Boelling (Libertarian) 1,057 (1.63%)  Ruida Lu (Ind) 484 (0.75%)
||
|Helena Jaczek
|-
|bgcolor=whitesmoke|61. Oshawa
|
|Jacquie Menezes 6,921 (17.42%)
||
|Jerry Ouellette 16,719 (42.08%)
|
|Mike Shields 14,316 (36.03%)
|
|Stacey Leadbetter 1,035 (2.60%)
|
|Ben Fudge (FPO) 147 (0.37%) Matthew Belanger (Libertarian) 435 (1.09%)
||
|Jerry Ouellette
|-
|bgcolor=whitesmoke|72. Pickering—Scarborough East
||
|Tracy MacCharles 18,201 (46.46%)
|
|Kevin Gaudet 13,033 (33.27%)
|
|Nerissa Cariño 6,424 (16.40%)
|
|Kevin Smith 1,096 (2.80%)
|
|Heath Thomas (Libertarian) 252 (0.64%)
||
|Wayne Arthurs†
|-
|bgcolor=whitesmoke|75. Richmond Hill
||
|Reza Moridi 18,042 (46.66%)
|
|Vic Gupta 13,763 (35.59%)
|
|Adam DeVita 4,987 (12.90%) 
|
|Brian Chamberlain 1,268 (3.28%)
|
|Tamas Demjen (Libertarian) 394 (1.02%)
||
|Reza Moridi
|-
|bgcolor=whitesmoke|89. Thornhill
|
|Bernie Farber 18,373 (40.71%)
||
|Peter Shurman 20,971 (46.46%)
|
|Cindy Hackelberg  4,024 (8.92%)
|
|Stephanie Duncan 756 (1.67%)
|
|Gene Balfour (Libertarian) 623 (1.38%)  Erin Gorman (FPO) 149 (0.33%)
||
|Peter Shurman
|-
|bgcolor=whitesmoke|97. Vaughan
||
|Greg Sorbara 26,174 (53.44%)
|
|Tony Genco 15,420 (31.48%)
|
|Paul Donofrio 5,594 (11.42%)
|
|Brendan Frye 694 (1.42%)
|
|David Natale (Reform) 218 (0.45%) Savino Quatela (Ind) 169 (0.35%)Paolo Fabrizio (Libertarian) 929 (1.9%)Terry Marino (COR) 169 (0.35%)
||
|Greg Sorbara
|-
|bgcolor=whitesmoke|100. Whitby—Oshawa
|
|Elizabeth Roy 16,988 (33.30%)
||
|Christine Elliott 24,499 (48.02%)
|
|Maret Sadem-Thompson 7,865 (15.42%)
|
|Bradley Gibson 1,139 (2.23%)
|
|Douglas Thom (FPO) 160 (0.31%) Dan King (PSN) 211 (0.41%)
||
|Christine Elliott
|}

Toronto

Scarborough

|-
|bgcolor=whitesmoke|80. Scarborough—Agincourt
||
|Soo Wong 14,907 (47.16%)
|
|Liang Chen 10,222 (32.34%)
|
|Paul Choi 5,017 (15.87%)
|
|Pauline Thompson 722 (2.28%)
|
|Priya Ahuja (Paramount) 209 (0.66%) Sabrina Wall (FPO) 83 (0.26%) Doug McLarty (Libertarian) 656 (2.08%)
||
|Gerry Phillips†
|-
|bgcolor=whitesmoke|81. Scarborough Centre
||
|Brad Duguid 16,142 (51.13%)
|
|Carol Williams 7,511 (23.79%)
|
|Kathleen Mathurin  6,876 (21.78%)
|
|Jeff Mole 558 (1.77%)
|
|David Driver (FPO) 301 (0.95%)
||
|Brad Duguid
|-
|bgcolor=whitesmoke|82. Scarborough—Guildwood
||
|Margarett Best 15,607 (48.59%)
|
|Gary Ellis 9,137 (28.45%)
|
|Lorri Urban 6,194 (19.29%)
|
|Naoshad Pochkhanawala 413 (1.29%)
|
|Sam Apelbaum (Libertarian) 407 (1.27%) Matthew Oliver (FPO) 136 (0.42%)
||
|Margarett Best
|-
|bgcolor=whitesmoke|83. Scarborough—Rouge River
||
|Bas Balkissoon 15,237 (41.63%)
|
|Ken Kim 6,837 (18.68%)
|
|Neethan Shan 13,088 (35.75%)
|
|George Singh 455 (1.24%)
|
|Felix Liao (Libertarian) 457 (1.25%) Daniel Walker (FPO) 150 (0.41%)Raphael Rosch (FCP) 166 (0.45%)
||
|Bas Balkissoon
|-
|bgcolor=whitesmoke|84. Scarborough Southwest
||
|Lorenzo Berardinetti 14,585 (43.89%)
|
|Mike Chopowick 7,061 (21.25%)
|
|Bruce Budd 10,404 (31.31%)
|
|Robin McKim 777 (2.41%)
|
|Caroline Blanco-Ruibal (FPO) 250 (0.75%)
||
|Lorenzo Berardinetti
|}

Toronto North Region

|-
|bgcolor=whitesmoke|16. Don Valley East
||
|Michael Coteau 16,350 (50.80%)
|
|Michael Lende 8,705 (27.05%)
|
|Bob Hilliard 5,953 (18.50%)
|
|Aren Bedrosyan 702 (2.18%)
|
|Wayne Simmons (FPO) 113 (0.35%) Ryan Kidd (FCP) 187 (0.58%)
||
|David Caplan†
|-
|bgcolor=whitesmoke|17. Don Valley West
||
|Kathleen Wynne 24,444 (58.15%)
|
|Andrea Mandel-Campbell 12,827 (30.52%)
|
|Khalid Ahmed 3,621 (8.61%)
|
|Louis Fliss 718 (1.71%)
|
|Soumen Deb (FPO) 74 (0.18%)Dimitris Kabitsis (Communist) 125 (0.30%) Rosemary Waigh (Vegan) 108 (0.26%)
||
|Kathleen Wynne
|-
|bgcolor=whitesmoke|20. Eglinton—Lawrence
||
|Mike Colle 20,752 (53.91%)
|
|Rocco Rossi 12,857 (33.40%)
|
|Gerti Dervishi 3,763 (9.78%)
|
|Josh Rachlis 575 (1.49%)
|
|Sujith Reddy (PSN) 79 (0.21%) Michael Bone (FPO) 152 (0.39%) Jerry Green (Ind) 146 (0.38%)
||
|Mike Colle
|-
|bgcolor=whitesmoke|101. Willowdale
||
|David Zimmer 21,984 (50.61%)
|
|Vince Agovino 14,528 (33.44%)
|
|Alexander Brown 5,556 (12.79%)
|
|Michael Vettese 874 (2.01%)
|
|Amy Brown (FPO) 297 (0.68%)
||
|David Zimmer
|-
|bgcolor=whitesmoke|104. York Centre
||
|Monte Kwinter 14,694 (44.91%)
|
|Michael Mostyn 11,506 (35.17%)
|
|John Fagan 4,579 (13.99%)
|
|Yuriy Shevyryov 535 (1.64%)
|
|Ron Tal (FPO) 108 (0.33%) David Epstein (Libertarian) 846 (2.59%) Jeff Pancer (Ind) 127 (0.39%)
||
|Monte Kwinter
|}

Toronto South Region

|-
|bgcolor=whitesmoke|5. Beaches—East York
|
|Helen Burstyn 13,813 (35.93%)
|
|Chris Menary 5,333 (13.87%)
||
|Michael Prue 17,925 (46.62%)
|
|Shawn Ali 1,025 (2.67%)
|
|Naomi Poley-Fisher (FPO) 144 (0.37%)Joe Ross (TOP) 45 (0.12%)
||
|Michael Prue
|-
|bgcolor=whitesmoke|15. Davenport
|
|Cristina Martins 12,953 (41.18%)
|
|Kirk Russell 2,480 (7.88%)
||
|Jonah Schein 14,367 (45.67%)
|
|Frank de Jong 855 (2.72%)
|
|Franz Cauchi (FPO) 96 (0.31%) Miguel Figueroa (Communist) 163 (0.52%)Kiros Ghiwot (TOP) 33 (0.10%)Mark Jagg (Ind) 250 (0.79%)Allix Thompson (PHR) 82 (0.26%)
||
|Tony Ruprecht†
|-
|bgcolor=whitesmoke|77. St. Paul's
||
|Eric Hoskins 25,048 (58.18%)
|
|Christine McGirr 8,972 (20.83%)
|
|David Hynes 7,124 (16.54%)
|
|Judith Van Veldhuysen 1,180 (2.74%)
|
|Keith Pinto (Socialist) 83 (0.20%) Mike Rita (FPO) 86 (0.20%) John Kittredge (Libertarian) 335 (0.78%)David Vallance (NOHP) 69 (0.16%)
||
|Eric Hoskins
|-
|bgcolor=whitesmoke|94. Toronto Centre 
||
|Glen Murray 25,236 (54.60%)
|
|Martin Abell 7,186 (15.55%)
| 
|Cathy Crowe 11,571 (25.03%)
|
|Mark Daye 1,123 (2.43%)
|
|Judi Falardeau (Libertarian) 441 (0.95%) Christopher Goodwin (FPO) 92 (0.20%) Cathy Holliday (Communist) 146 (0.32%) Bahman Yazdanfar (CCP) 19 (0.04%) Harvey Rotenberg (Vegan) 93 (0.20%) Phil Sarazen (People) 29 (0.06%)
||
|Glen Murray
|-
|bgcolor=whitesmoke|95. Toronto—Danforth
|
|Marisa Sterling 11,369 (30.88%)
|
|Rita Jethi 3,488 (9.47%)
||
|Peter Tabuns 20,062 (54.49%)
|
|Tim Whalley 1,354 (3.68%)
|
|Stéphane Vera (FPO) 107 (0.29%) Kevin Clarke (People) 143 (0.39%) John Recker (Libertarian) 440 (1.2%) John Richardson (CCP) 75 (0.20%) Neil Mercer (TOP) 110 (0.3%)
||
|Peter Tabuns
|-
|bgcolor=whitesmoke|96. Trinity—Spadina
|
|Sarah Thomson 18,731 (39.76%)
|
|Mike Yen 5,420 (11.50%)
||
|Rosario Marchese 19,870 (42.18%)
|
|Tim Grant 2,415 (5.13%)
|
|Guy Fogel (Socialist) 117 (0.25%) Silvio Ursomarzo (FPO) 126 (0.27%) Danish Ahmed (PSN) 139 (0.30%)Araba Ocran-Caesar (PHR) 88 (0.19%)
||
|Rosario Marchese
|}

Toronto West Region

|-
|bgcolor=whitesmoke|23. Etobicoke Centre
||
|Donna Cansfield 21,916 (51.16%)
|
|Mary Anne De Monte-Whelan 13,956 (32.58%)
|
|Ana Maria Rivero 5,099 (11.90%)
|
|Cheryll San Juan 837 (1.95%)
|
|Alexander Bussmann (Libertarian) 422 (0.99%) Liz Millican (FCP) 231 (0.54%) Marco Renda (FPO) 108 (0.25%)
||
|Donna Cansfield
|-
|bgcolor=whitesmoke|24. Etobicoke—Lakeshore
||
|Laurel Broten 22,169 (50.73%)
|
|Simon Nyilassy 12,705 (29.07%)
|
|Dionne Coley 6,713 (15.36%)
|
|Angela Salewsky 1,164 (2.66%)
|
|Mark Brombacher (FPO) 174 (0.40%) Natalie Lochwin (Socialist) 125 (0.29%) Hans Kunov (Libertarian) 172 (0.39%) John Letonja (Ind) 113 (0.26%)Thane MacKay (Ind) 113 (0.26%)
||
|Laurel Broten
|-
|bgcolor=whitesmoke|25. Etobicoke North
||
|Shafiq Qaadri 12,081 (48.17%)
|
|Karm Singh 6,072 (24.21%)
|
|Vrind Sharma 5,426 (21.63%)
|
|Gurleen Gill 541 (2.16%)
|
|Gopal Baghel (Paramount) 100 (0.40%) Claudio Ceolin (FCP) 391 (1.56%) James McConnell (FPO) 320 (1.28%) 
||
|Shafiq Qaadri
|-
|bgcolor=whitesmoke|68. Parkdale—High Park
|
|Cortney Pasternak 14,877 (39.23%)
|
|Joe Ganetakos 4,668 (11.68%)
||
|Cheri DiNovo 18,365 (45.96%)
|
|Justin Trottier 1,325 (3.32%)
|
|Rod Rojas (Libertarian) 172 (0.43%) Istvan Tar (Ind) 39 (0.10%) Thomas Zaugg (People) 56 (0.14%)George Babula (Ind) 84 (0.21%)Cecilia Luu (Ind) 78 (0.20%)Bohdan Ewhen Radejewsky (Ind) 88 (0.22%)
||
|Cheri DiNovo
|-
|bgcolor=whitesmoke|106. York South—Weston
||
|Laura Albanese 13,805 (44.23%)
|
|Lan Daniel 3,441 (11.02%)
|
|Paul Ferreira 13,071 (41.88%)
|
|Keith Jarrett 474 (1.52%)
|
|Eric Compton (FPO) 151 (0.48%)Mark Micheal Radejewsky (Ind) 45 (0.14%)
||
|Laura Albanese
|-
|bgcolor=whitesmoke|107. York West
||
|Mario Sergio 11,455 (50.11%)
|
|Karlene Nation 2,735 (11.97%)
|
|Tom Rakocevic 7,901 (34.57%)
|
|Joseph Rini 287 (1.26%)
|
|Kayla Baptiste (FPO) 107 (0.47%)Scott Aitchison (Ind) 89 (0.39%) Leland Cornell (Ind) 114 (0.50%)
||
|Mario Sergio
|-
|}

Brampton, Mississauga & Oakville

|-
|bgcolor=whitesmoke|6. Bramalea—Gore—Malton
|
|Kuldip Kular 14,349 (32.69%)
|
|Sanjeev Maingi 9,896 (22.55%)
||
|Jagmeet Singh 16,626 (37.88%)
|
|Pauline Thornham 1,091 (2.49%)
|
|Linda O'Marra (FCP) 381 (0.87%) Joy Lee (Libertarian) 738 (1.68%) Archie McLachlan (Ind) 491 (1.12%)
||
|Kuldip Kular
|-
|bgcolor=whitesmoke|7. Brampton—Springdale
||
|Linda Jeffrey 15,663 (44.13%)
|
|Pam Hundal 12,754 (35.93%)
|
|Mani Singh 5,378 (15.15%)
|
|James Duncan 900 (2.54%)
|
|Elizabeth Rowley (Communist) 152 (0.43%) Jasbir Singh (Paramount) 136 (0.38%) Fauzia Sadiq (COR) 81 (0.23%) Bart Wysokinski (FCP) 193 (0.54%)
||
|Linda Jeffrey
|-
|bgcolor=whitesmoke|8. Brampton West
||
|Vic Dhillon 19,224 (43.50%)
|
|Ben Shenouda 14,434 (32.66%)
|
|Dalbir Kathuria 8,331 (18.85%)
|
|Patti Chmelyk 1,432 (3.24%)
|
|Ted Harlson (FPO) 509 (1.15%)
||
|Vic Dhillon
|-
|bgcolor=whitesmoke|47. Mississauga—Brampton South
||
|Amrit Mangat 15,579 (45.71%)
|
|Amarjeet Gill 10,287 (30.18%)
|
|Karanjit Pandher  5,420 (15.90%)
|
|Keith Foster 1,247 (3.66%)
|
|Christin Milloy (Libertarian) 691 (2.03%)Masood Khan (Ind) 400 (1.17%) Walter Widla (Ind) 216 (0.63%)
||
|Amrit Mangat
|-
|bgcolor=whitesmoke|48. Mississauga East—Cooksville
||
|Dipika Damerla 15,535 (45.49%)
|
|Zoran Churchin 11,297 (33.08%)
|
|Waseem Ahmed 5,704 (16.70%)
|
|Lloyd Jones 934 (2.73%)
|
|Jonathon Dury (FPO) 177 (0.52%) Shriya Shah (Paramount) 117 (0.34%) Winston Harding (Ind) 199 (0.58%)
||
|Vacant
|-
|bgcolor=whitesmoke|49. Mississauga—Erindale
||
|Harinder Takhar 20,552 (44.90%)
|
|David Brown 16,294 (35.59%)
|
|Michelle Bilek 7,768 (16.97%)
|
|Otto Casanova 853 (1.86%)
|
|Gerald Jackson (FPO) 176 (0.38%)
||
|Harinder Takhar
|-
|bgcolor=whitesmoke|50. Mississauga South
||
|Charles Sousa 20,375 (50.49%)
|
|Geoff Janoscik 14,499 (35.93%)
|
|Anju Sikka 4,044 (10.20%)
|
|Cory Mogk 860 (2.13%)
|
|Mark Harris (FPO) 236 (0.58%)Paul Figueiras (Vegan) 165 (0.41%)
||
|Charles Sousa
|-
|bgcolor=whitesmoke|51. Mississauga—Streetsville
||
|Bob Delaney 18,591 (51.36%)
|
|Wafik Sunbaty 10,655 (29.44%)
|
|Raed Ayad 5,494 (15.18%)
|
|Scott Warner 1,329 (3.67%)
|
|
||
|Bob Delaney
|-
|bgcolor=whitesmoke|60. Oakville
||
|Kevin Flynn 21,711 (47.92%)
|
|Larry Scott 17,131 (37.81%)
|
|Lesley Sprague 4,625 (10.21%)
|
|Andrew Chlobowski 878 (1.94%)
|
|Jonathan Banzuela (FCP) 188 (0.41%)Steve Hunter (FPO) 115 (0.25%)
Mike Harris (Ind) 498 (1.1%)
||
|Kevin Flynn
|}

Hamilton, Burlington & Niagara

|-
|bgcolor=whitesmoke|3. Ancaster—Dundas—Flamborough—Westdale
|| 
|Ted McMeekin 21,648 (43.54%)
|
|Donna Skelly 17,132 (34.45%)
|
|Trevor Westerhoff 8,521 (17.14%)
|
|Erik Coverdale 1,477 (2.97%)
|
|Glenn Langton (Libertarian) 258 (0.52%) Rick Gunderman Smith (Communist) 87 (0.17%) Bob Maton (FCP) 321 (0.65%) Peter Melanson (FPO) 99 (0.20%)
||
|Ted McMeekin
|-
|bgcolor=whitesmoke|11. Burlington
|
|Karmel Sakran 17,909 (35.91%)
||
|Jane McKenna 20,061 (40.22%)
|
|Peggy Russell 9,370 (18.79%)
|
|Alex Brown 1,129 (2.26%)
|
|Andrew Brannan (FPO) 156 (0.31%) Anthony Giles (Libertarian) 639 (1.28%) Tim O'Brien (FCP) 380 (0.76%)
||
|Joyce Savoline†
|-
|bgcolor=whitesmoke|30. Halton
|
|Indira Naidoo-Harris 23,080 (39.01%)
||
|Ted Chudleigh 26,228 (44.33%)
|
|Nik Spohr 7,757 (13.11%)
|
|Karen Fraser 1,286 (2.17%)
|
|Gina van den Burg (FPO) 168 (0.28%) Tony Rodrigues (FCP) 296 (0.50%) Phil Buck (Ind) 166 (0.28%)
||
|Ted Chudleigh
|-
|bgcolor=whitesmoke|31. Hamilton Centre
|
|Donna Tiqui-Shebib 5,861 (17.37%)
|
|Don Sheppard 4,421 (13.10%)
||
|Andrea Horwath 20,586 (61.01%)
|
|Peter Ormond 1,249 (3.70%)
|
|Chris Lawson (FPO) 130 (0.39%)Anthony Gracey (Communist) 122 (0.36%) Michael Baldasaro (Ind) 268 (0.79%) Robert Kuhlmann (Libertarian) 634 (1.88%) Steven Passmore (FCP) 229 (0.68%) Robert Szajkowski (Reform) 67 (0.20%)
||
|Andrea Horwath
|-
|bgcolor=whitesmoke|32. Hamilton East—Stoney Creek
|
|Mark Cripps 10,397 (26.16%)
|
|Nancy Fiorentino 7,395 (18.61%)
||
|Paul Miller 20,442 (51.44%)
|
|Peter Randall 692 (1.74%)
|
|Greg Pattinson (Libertarian) 295 (0.74%) Philip Doucette (FPO) 133 (0.33%) Bob Green Innes (FCP) 173 (0.44%) 
||
|Paul Miller
|-
|bgcolor=whitesmoke|33. Hamilton Mountain
|
|Sophia Aggelonitis 14,694 (32.24%)
|
|Geordie Elms 8,641 (18.96%)
||
|Monique Taylor 20,492 (44.96%)
|
|Tony Morris 748 (1.64%)
|
|Brian Goodwin (FPO) 126 (0.28%) Hans Wienhold (Libertarian) 222 (0.49%) Jim Enos (FCP) 450 (0.99%)
||
|Sophia Aggelonitis
|-
|bgcolor=whitesmoke|54. Niagara Falls
||
|Kim Craitor 16,794 (35.66%)
|
|George Lepp  16,296 (34.60%)
|
|Wayne Redekop  12,304 (26.13%)
|
|Byrne Smith 759 (1.61%)
|
|Adam Hyde (Libertarian) 217 (0.46%) Jeannette Tossounian (Ind) 119 (0.25%) Tim Tredwell (Ind) 112 (0.24%)John Jankovic (FCP) 191 (0.41%)
||
|Kim Craitor
|-
|bgcolor=whitesmoke|55. Niagara West—Glanbrook
|
|Katie Trombetta 12,708 (25.88%)
||
|Tim Hudak 24,919 (50.74%)
|
|Anthony Marco 9,070 (18.47%)
|
|Meredith Cross 1,372 (2.79%)
|
|Geoff Peacock (FPO) 80 (0.16%) Gerry Augustine (Reform) 130 (0.26%) Rob Wienhold (Libertarian) 166 (0.34%) Marty Poos (People) 158 (0.32%) Phil Lees (FCP) 303 (0.62%)
||
|Tim Hudak
|-
|bgcolor=whitesmoke|76. St. Catharines
|| 
|Jim Bradley 17,166 (40.03%)
|
|Sandie Bellows 15,461 (36.05%)
|
|Irene Lowell 8,624 (20.11%)
|
|Jennifer Mooradian 1,066 (2.49%)
|
|Saleh Waziruddin (Communist) 68 (0.16%)Chris Clarke (FCP) 191 (0.45%)Jon Radick (CCP) 62 (0.14%)Dave Unrau (FPO) 57 (0.13%)
||
|Jim Bradley
|-
|bgcolor=whitesmoke|98. Welland
|
|Benoit Mercier 8,638 (19.64%)
|
|Domenic Ursini 14,048 (31.95%)
||
|Cindy Forster 19,527 (44.41%)
|
|Donna Cridland 1,005 (2.29%)
|
|Donna-Lynne Hamilton (Libertarian) 505 (1.15%)
||
|Peter Kormos†
|}

Midwestern Ontario

|-
|bgcolor=whitesmoke|9. Brant
||
|Dave Levac 16,867 (36.93%)
|
|Michael St. Amant 15,761 (34.50%)
|
|Brian Van Tilborg 11,006 (24.09%)
|
|Ken Burns 957 (2.10%)
|
|Daniel Hockley (FCP) 237 (0.52%) Rob Ferguson (Libertarian) 190 (0.42%) John Turmel (Paupers) 86 (0.19%) Martin Sitko (Ind) 244 (0.53%)Dustin Jenner (FPO) 136 (0.30%)
||
|Dave Levac
|-
|bgcolor=whitesmoke|12. Cambridge
|
|Kathryn McGarry 13,993 (32.93%)
||
|Rob Leone 15,947 (37.53%)
|
|Atinuke Bankole 10,414 (24.51%)
|
|Jacques Malette 1,056 (2.48%)
|
|Allan Dettweiler (Libertarian) 629 (1.48%)Robert Ross (Ind.) 271 (0.64%)
||
|Gerry Martiniuk†
|-
|bgcolor=whitesmoke|27. Guelph
||
|Liz Sandals 19,815 (42.25%)
|
|Greg Schirk 11,954 (25.49%)
|
|James Gordon 11,150 (23.77%)
|
| Steven Dyck 3,234 (6.90%)
|
|Drew Garvie (Communist) 139 (0.30%) Phil Bender (Libertarian) 305 (0.65%) Julian Ichim (Ind) 100 (0.21%)
||
|Liz Sandals
|-
|bgcolor=whitesmoke|28. Haldimand—Norfolk
|
|Greg Crone 7,087 (17.04%)
||
|Toby Barrett 25,203 (60.59%)
|
|Ian Nichols 8,048 (19.35%)
|
|Justin Blake 868 (2.09%)
|
|John Gots (FCP) 242 (0.58%)
||
|Toby Barrett
|-
|bgcolor=whitesmoke|34. Huron—Bruce
|
|Carol Mitchell 14,659 (32.63%)
||
|Lisa Thompson 19,138 (42.60%)
|
|Grant Robertson 9,329 (20.77%)
|
|Patrick Main 772 (1.78%)
|
|Christine Schnurr (FCP) 656 (1.46%)Dennis Valenta (Ind) 200 (0.45%)
||
|Carol Mitchell
|-
|bgcolor=whitesmoke|37. Kitchener Centre
||
|John Milloy 15,392 (39.06%)
|
|Dave MacDonald 15,069 (38.24%)
|
|Cameron Dearlove 7,385 (18.74%)
|
|Mark Vercouteren 938 (2.38%)
|
|Bugra Atsiz (FPO) 77 (0.20%)Patrick Bernier (Libertarian) 240 (0.61%)Mark Corbiere (Ind) 137 (0.35%)
||
|John Milloy
|-
|bgcolor=whitesmoke|38. Kitchener—Conestoga
|
|Leeanna Pendergast 14,476 (35.29%)
||
|Michael Harris 18,017 (43.92%)
| 
|Mark Cairns 7,165 (17.47%)
|
|Robert Rose 1,121 (2.73%)
|
|
||
|Leeanna Pendergast
|-
|bgcolor=whitesmoke|39. Kitchener—Waterloo
|
|Eric Davis 17,837 (35.91%)
||
|Elizabeth Witmer 21,665 (43.62%)
|
|Isabel Cisterna 8,250 (16.61%)
|
|J.D. McGuire 1,308 (2.63%)
|
|Melanie Motz (FPO) 123 (0.25%) Peter Davis  (Ind) 316 (0.64%)
||
|Elizabeth Witmer
|-
|bgcolor=whitesmoke|67. Oxford
|
|David Hilderley 9,410 (24.91%)
||
|Ernie Hardeman 20,658 (54.69%)
|
|Dorothy Marie Eisen 5,885 (15.58%)
|
|Catherine Stewart-Mott 1,336 (3.54%)
|
|Leonard Vanderhoeven (FCP) 359 (0.95%)
||
|Ernie Hardeman
|-
|bgcolor=whitesmoke|70. Perth—Wellington
|
|John Wilkinson 14,635 (39.53%)
||
|Randy Pettapiece 14,845 (40.09%)
|
|Ellen Papenburg 5,836 (15.76%)
|
|Chris Desjardins 918 (2.48%)
|
|Robert Smink (FPO) 164 (0.44%) Irma DeVries (FCP) 627 (1.69%)
||
|John Wilkinson
|-
|bgcolor=whitesmoke|99. Wellington—Halton Hills
|
|Moya Johnson 11,334 (26.74%)
||
|Ted Arnott 23,495 (55.44%)
|
|Dale Hamilton 6,106 (14.41%)
|
|Raymond Dartsch 1,309 (3.09%)
|
|
||
|Ted Arnott
|}

Southwestern Ontario

|-
|bgcolor=whitesmoke|14. Chatham-Kent—Essex
|
|Paul Watson 11,631 (31.93%)
||
|Rick Nicholls 15,121 (41.51%) 
|
|Aleksandra Navarro 8,415 (23.10%)
|
|Holly Sullivan 1,027 (2.82%)
|
|
||
|Pat Hoy†
|-
|bgcolor=whitesmoke|21. Elgin—Middlesex—London
|
|Lori Baldwin-Sands 11,075 (26.71%)
||
|Jeff Yurek 19,771 (47.68%)
|
|Kathy Cornish 9,201 (22.19%)
|
|Eric Loewen 981 (2.37%)
|
|Paul McKeever (FPO) 283 (0.68%)
||
|Steve Peters†
|-
|bgcolor=whitesmoke|22. Essex
|
|Ken Schmidt 11,518 (25.03%)
|
|Dave Brister 16,049 (34.88%)
||
|Taras Natyshak 17,417 (37.85%)
|
|Jason Matyi 860 (1.87%)
|
|
||
|Bruce Crozier†
|-
|bgcolor=whitesmoke|40. Lambton—Kent—Middlesex
|
|Maria Van Bommel 12,423 (29.20%)
||
|Monte McNaughton 19,379 (45.55%)
|
|Joe Hill 8,882 (20.87%)
|
|James Armstrong 987 (2.32%)
|
|Brad Harness (Reform) 232 (0.55%) Marinus Vander Vloet (FCP) 350 (0.82%)Tom Jackson (FPO) 119 (0.28%)
||
|Maria Van Bommel
|-
|bgcolor=whitesmoke|43. London—Fanshawe
|
|Khalil Ramal 9,678 (28.10%)
|
|Cheryl Miller 9,075 (26.35%)
||
|Teresa Armstrong 13,953 (40.51%)
|
|Bassam Lazar 852 (2.47%)
|
|Tim Harnick (Libertarian) 320 (0.93%) Dave Durnin (FPO) 155 (0.45%) Ali Hamadi (Ind) 192 (0.56%)
||
|Khalil Ramal
|-
|bgcolor=whitesmoke|44. London North Centre
||
|Deb Matthews 19,167 (43.69%)
|
|Nancy Branscombe 12,628 (28.79%)
|
|Steve Holmes 9,914 (22.60%)
|
|Kevin Labonte 1,451 (3.31%)
|
|Michael Spottiswood (Paupers) 54 (0.12%) Mary Lou Ambrogio (FPO) 269 (0.61%) Jordan vanKlinken (Libertarian) 169 (0.39%)
||
|Deb Matthews
|-
|bgcolor=whitesmoke|45. London West
||
|Chris Bentley 22,610 (45.45%)
|
|Ali Chahbar 14,603 (29.35%)
|
|Jeff Buchanan 10,757 (21.62%)
|
|Gary Brown 1,194 (2.40%)
|
|Tim Hodges (FPO) 300 (0.60%) Chris Gupta (PFRP) 61 (0.12%)
||
|Chris Bentley
|-
|bgcolor=whitesmoke|78. Sarnia—Lambton
|
|Stephanie Barry 8,819 (21.67%)
||
|Bob Bailey 19,570 (48.08%)
|
|Brian White 10,307 (25.32%)
|
|Jason Vermette 567 (1.39%)
|
|Andy Bruziewicz (Ind) 1,077 (2.65%)Andrew Falby (Libertarian) 160 (0.39%)
||
|Bob Bailey
|-
|bgcolor=whitesmoke|102. Windsor—Tecumseh
||
|Dwight Duncan 15,946 (42.58%)
|
|Robert de Verteuil 7,751 (20.70%)
|
|Andrew McAvoy 12,228 (32.65%)
|
|Justin Levesque 830 (2.22%)
|
|Dan Dominato (Libertarian) 476 (1.27%)
||
|Dwight Duncan
|-
|bgcolor=whitesmoke|103. Windsor West
||
|Teresa Piruzza 14,127 (41.05%)
|
|Todd Branch 8,476 (24.61%)
|
|Helmi Charif 10,544 (30.64%)
|
|Chad Durocher 1,051 (3.05%)
|
|
||
|Sandra Pupatello†
|}

Northern Ontario

|-
|bgcolor=whitesmoke|2. Algoma—Manitoulin
|
|Mike Brown 7,397 (28.28%)
|
|Joe Chapman 6,141 (23.48%)
||
|Michael Mantha 11,585 (44.29%)
|
|Justin Tilson 684 (2.61%)
|
|David Hoffman (FCP) 217 (0.83%)
||
|Mike Brown 
|-
|bgcolor=whitesmoke|35. Kenora—Rainy River
|
|Anthony Leek 2,202 (9.95%)
|
|Rod McKay 8,307 (37.54%)
||
|Sarah Campbell 10,949 (49.48%)
|
|JoJo Holiday 391 (1.77%)
|
|Charmaine Romaniuk (NOHP) 216 (0.98%)
||
|Howard Hampton†
|-
|bgcolor=whitesmoke|56. Nickel Belt
|
|Tony Ryma 7,451 (24.15%)
|
|Paula Peroni 5,625 (18.23%)
||
|France Gélinas 16,876 (54.69%)
|
|Stephanie-Lynn Russell 810 (2.62%)
|
|
||
|France Gélinas
|-
|bgcolor=whitesmoke|57. Nipissing
|
|Catherine Whiting 8,775 (28.45%)
||
|Vic Fedeli 15,381 (49.86%) 
|
|Henri Giroux 5,567 (18.05%)
|
|Scott Haig 971 (2.82%)
|
|
||
|Monique Smith†
|-
|bgcolor=whitesmoke|69. Parry Sound—Muskoka
|
|Cindy Waters 6,537 (18.12%)
||
|Norm Miller 19,417 (53.83%)
|
|Alex Zyganiuk 6,527 (18.10%)
|
|Matt Richter 3,251 (9.01%)
|
|Andris Stivrins (FPO) 167 (0.46%)
||
|Norm Miller
|-
|bgcolor=whitesmoke|79. Sault Ste. Marie
||
|David Orazietti 16,109 (54.68%)
|
|Jib Turner 3,477 (11.82%)
|
|Celia Ross 9,037 (30.67%)
|
|Luke Macmichael 519 (1.76%)
|
|Matthew Hunt (FCP) 172 (0.58%)
||
|David Orazietti
|-
|bgcolor=whitesmoke|88. Sudbury
||
|Rick Bartolucci 13,735 (42.22%)
|
|Gerry Labelle 4,400 (13.53%)
|
|Paul Loewenberg 13,204 (40.59%)
|
|Pat Rogerson 870 (2.67%)
|
|Carita Murphy Marketos (FCP) 164 (0.50%) David Popescu (Ind) 44 (0.14%)
||
|Rick Bartolucci
|-
|bgcolor=whitesmoke|90. Thunder Bay—Atikokan
||
|Bill Mauro 10,319 (38.83%)
|
|Fred Gilbert 5,815 (21.88%)
|
|Mary Kozorys 9,881 (37.18%)
|
|Jonathan Milnes 379 (1.43%)
|
|Marvin Robert McMenemy (Ind) 86 (0.32%)
||
|Bill Mauro
|-
|bgcolor=whitesmoke|91. Thunder Bay—Superior North
||
|Michael Gravelle 11,765 (44.84%)
|
|Anthony LeBlanc 4,578 (17.45%)
|
|Steve Mantis 9,111 (34.72%)
|
|Scot Kyle 555 (2.12%)
|
|Tony Gallo (Libertarian) 133 (0.51%)
||
|Michael Gravelle
|-
|bgcolor=whitesmoke|92. Timiskaming—Cochrane
|
|Denis Bonin 6,532 (25.82%)
|
|Randy Aulbrook 5,337 (21.10%)
||
|John Vanthof 12,633 (49.94%)
|
|Tina Danese 312 (1.23%)
|
|Gerry Courville (NOHP) 391 (1.55%)
||
|David Ramsay†
|-
|bgcolor=whitesmoke|93. Timmins—James Bay
|
|Leonard Rickard 2,870 (12.32%)
|
|Alan Spacek 8,515 (36.56%)
||
|Gilles Bisson 11,479 (49.29%)
|
|Angela Plant 233 (1.00%)
|
|Robert Neron (FPO) 108 (0.46%)
||
|Gilles Bisson
|}

 †Indicates MPP not running for re-election.

Largest Popular Vote

References

Candidates in Ontario provincial elections
Candidates